The 1964 United States Senate election in Tennessee was held on November 3, 1964, concurrently with the U.S. presidential election as well the other U.S. Senate special election in Tennessee, as well as other elections to the United States Senate in other states as well as elections to the United States House of Representatives and various state and local elections. 

Democrat Albert Gore Sr. won re-election to a third term. Gore defeated Republican Dan Kuykendall.

Democratic primary

Candidates
Sam Galloway
Albert Gore Sr., incumbent U.S. Senator
W. N. McKinney
Charles Gordon Vick, perennial candidate

Results

Republican primary
Dan Kuykendall was unopposed.

General election

Results

See also
1964 United States Senate elections

References

1964
Tennessee
United States Senate